The 1999 UCI Track Cycling World Championships were the World Championship for track cycling. They took place in Berlin, Germany from October 20 to October 24, 1999. Twelve events were contested, eight for the men and four for the women. France dominated most of the events, with Félicia Ballanger and Marion Clignet making a clean sweep of the women's championships by taking two golds each, France won over half of the gold medals on offer.

Medal table

Medal summary

External links
World Track Championships Berlin, October 20 - 24, 1999 cyclingnews.com
1999 results on the UCI website

Uci Track Cycling World Championships, 1999
Track cycling
UCI Track Cycling World Championships by year
International cycle races hosted by Germany
UCI Track Cycling World Championships